Yefremovsky (masculine), Yefremovskaya (feminine), or Yefremovskoye (neuter) is the name of several rural localities in Russia:
Yefremovsky, Rostov Oblast, a khutor in Malokirsanovskoye Rural Settlement of Matveyevo-Kurgansky District of Rostov Oblast
Yefremovsky, Volgograd Oblast, a khutor in Perelazovsky Selsoviet of Kletsky District of Volgograd Oblast
Yefremovskaya, Arkhangelsk Oblast, a village in Zabelinsky Selsoviet of Kotlassky District of Arkhangelsk Oblast
Yefremovskaya, Moscow Oblast, a village under the administrative jurisdiction of the Town of  Yegoryevsk in Yegoryevsky District of Moscow Oblast
Yefremovskaya, Vologda Oblast, a village in Pechengsky Selsoviet of Kirillovsky District of Vologda Oblast